Madina Sadigova is an Azerbaijani karateka. She won one of the bronze medals in the women's 55kg event at the 2022 European Karate Championships held in 
Gaziantep, Turkey. She won one of the bronze medals in the women's 55kg event at the 2021 Islamic Solidarity Games held in Konya, Turkey.

Achievements

References

External links 
 

Living people
Year of birth missing (living people)
Place of birth missing (living people)
Azerbaijani female karateka
Islamic Solidarity Games medalists in karate
Islamic Solidarity Games competitors for Azerbaijan
21st-century Azerbaijani women